Worldwide Retail Store S.L. (WRS) is a Spanish holding company founded in 2006 and based in Madrid.

Previously, WRS had stores in Madrid, London, Singapore, and franchised airport stores in Panama, Sydney, and Dublin.

References

External links 
 Worldwide Retail Store Official Website

Retail companies of Spain